Contagion is a 1987 Australian horror film directed by Karl Zwicky and starring John Doyle, Nicola Bartlett and Ray Barrett.

The film was shot around Brisbane in 35 days.

Plot
Mark is a naive real estate agent who is tricked into going into an old mansion and finds himself trapped inside and tortured by malevolent spirits.

Cast
John Doyle as Mark
Nicola Bartlett as Cheryl
Ray Barrett as Bael
Nathy Gaffney as Cleo
Jacqueline Brennan as Trish
Michael Simpson as Frank
Pamela Hawkesford as Helen
Chris Betts as Alec

References

External links
Contagion at IMDb
Contagion at Oz Movies

Australian horror films
Films directed by Karl Zwicky
1987 horror films
1987 films
1980s English-language films
1980s Australian films